The  is a Buddhist shrine at Makomanai Takino Cemetery in Sapporo, Japan, designed by Japanese modernist architect Tadao Ando.

The design incorporated the pre-existing Buddha statue, which was sculpted circa 2000 and stood solitary. On approaching the statue, only the head sticks out from the hill, and the shrine is entered through a tunnel for a full view of the statue inside of the open rotunda. The building opened in December 2015.

References 

Buildings and structures in Sapporo
Tadao Ando buildings
Buddhist cemeteries